Cardiff International Food and Drink Festival is an annual food festival held in Cardiff, Wales.

Overview
The festival is held over three days during July, from Friday to Sunday, at Roald Dahl Plas (The Oval Basin) in Cardiff Bay, next to the Mermaid Quay complex. 

There are over 100 local, national and international producers. There is a Street Food Piazza, a Producers’ Fayre and Farmers’ Market. The Street Food Piazza is the biggest outdoor street food piazza in Wales, with numerous bars and stalls along the water’s edge at Cardiff Bay. There are daily children’s workshops for young chefs to create their own dishes. There are also craft stalls and live music.

See also
Cuisine of Wales

References

Further reading
Business Wales, Food and Drink
About Wales, Welsh Food Festivals

1999 establishments in Wales
Food and drink festivals in the United Kingdom
Tourist attractions in Cardiff
Annual events in Wales
Summer events in Wales
July events
Festivals in Cardiff